Jacob Payson Chamberlain (August 1, 1802 – October 5, 1878) was a U.S. Representative from New York during the American Civil War.

Life and career
Jacob P. Chamberlain was born in Dudley, Massachusetts on August 1, 1802. His family moved to western New York in 1807. He was educated there and became a school teacher and farmer and served as Varick's Town Clerk before settling in Seneca Falls, New York, where he began a business career.

Chamberlain owned and operated farms, flour mills, malthouses, distilleries and woolen mills, and was one of the original organizers of the first bank in Seneca Falls.

Originally a Bucktail Democrat, he later became a Whig, and joined the Republican Party when it was founded in the mid-1850s. He served in several local offices, including school board member and village president.

Chamberlain was an active supporter of the Methodist Episcopal Church.

In 1848 he attended the Seneca Falls Convention and was one of the signers of the Declaration of Sentiments which called for equal rights for women.

He was a member of the New York State Assembly in 1859.

Chamberlain was elected as a Republican to the Thirty-seventh Congress (March 4, 1861 – March 3, 1863).  He was not a candidate for renomination and returned to his business and farming interests.

Death and burial
He died in Seneca Falls, New York, October 5, 1878 and was interred in Restvale Cemetery.

Family
Chamberlain had an uncle named Jacob Chamberlain, and a cousin, Jacob M. Chamberlain.  They lived in the same area, and they are sometimes confused with each other in records and documents.

References

External resources
  Retrieved on 2009-5-12
 

1802 births
1878 deaths
People from Dudley, Massachusetts
People from Seneca Falls, New York
New York (state) Democratic-Republicans
New York (state) Whigs
Members of the New York State Assembly
People of New York (state) in the American Civil War
Republican Party members of the United States House of Representatives from New York (state)
19th-century American politicians